Ilan Van Wilder (born 14 May 2000 in Jette) is a Belgian cyclist, who currently rides for UCI WorldTeam . In October 2020, he was named in the startlist for the 2020 Vuelta a España.

Major results

2017
 2nd La Route des Géants
 6th Overall Driedaagse van Axel
1st  Young rider classification
 6th La Philippe Gilbert juniors
 6th Overall Aubel–Thimister–La Gleize
 7th La Classique des Alpes Juniors
 8th Overall Oberösterreich Juniorenrundfahrt
 8th Overall Course de la Paix Juniors
 9th Overall GP Général Patton
2018
 1st Nokere Koerse Juniors
 UEC European Junior Road Championships
2nd  Time trial
4th Road race
 2nd Time trial, National Junior Road Championships
 2nd Overall Giro della Lunigiana
 2nd Overall Oberösterreich Juniorenrundfahrt
 3rd Guido Reybrouck Classic
 5th Overall Aubel–Thimister–Stavelot
 6th Overall Driedaagse van Axel
1st Stage 2 (ITT)
 7th Time trial, UCI Junior Road World Championships
 7th Overall GP Général Patton
 8th Gent–Wevelgem Juniors
 9th Overall Course de la Paix Juniors
2019
 1st  Young rider classification, Le Triptyque des Monts et Châteaux
 3rd Time trial, National Under-23 Road Championships
 3rd Overall Tour de l'Avenir
 3rd Overall Orlen Nations Grand Prix
 4th Overall Grand Prix Priessnitz spa
1st Stage 2
 7th Overall Ronde de l'Isard
 9th Time trial, UEC European Under-23 Road Championships
2020
 3rd  Time trial, UEC European Under-23 Road Championships
2021
 4th Time trial, National Road Championships
 10th Overall Settimana Internazionale di Coppi e Bartali
2022
 5th Overall Vuelta a Burgos
 6th Overall Tour de la Provence
2023
 3rd Overall Volta ao Algarve
 3rd Trofeo Serra de Tramuntana

Grand Tour general classification results timeline

References

External links

2000 births
Living people
Belgian male cyclists
People from Jette
Cyclists from Brussels